Dyckman may refer to:

 Dyckman House, the oldest remaining farmhouse in Manhattan
 Dyckman Street, a street in the Inwood neighborhood of Manhattan, New York City
 Emory F. Dyckman (1877–1930), American lawyer and politician
 States Dyckman, a wealthy British Loyalist in the American Revolution

See also
 Dykeman (disambiguation)
 Dykman, a surname
 Pete Campbell, born Peter Dyckman Campbell, a fictional character played by Vincent Kartheiser in the U.S. TV series Mad Men